Knight Center may refer to:

Knight Center (Metromover station), a mass transit station in Miami, Florida, United States
The Knight Center for Journalism in the Americas, a research unit at the University of Texas at Austin's Moody College of Communication which focuses on promoting journalism in Central America and South America
The Knight Center for Specialized Journalism, a national program in the United States which offers free seminars for reporters, editors, and editorial writers
The James L. Knight International Center, an entertainment and convention complex in Miami, Florida, United States
The John S. Knight Center, a convocation center in Akron, Ohio, United States